Elizjah Johnson Scott (born April 19, 1999) is an American professional basketball player for MBK Handlová of the Slovak Basketball League (SBL). He played college basketball for the Loyola Marymount Lions of the West Coast Conference (WCC).

High school career
Scott attended Upland High School in Upland, California before transferring to Chino Hills High School in Chino Hills, California for his sophomore season. He was ruled ineligible for his first year by the CIF Southern Section. As a junior, he started alongside Lonzo Ball, LaMelo Ball, LiAngelo Ball and Onyeka Okongwu, helping Chino Hills achieve a 35–0 record and win the CIF Open Division state title. He averaged 19.4 points, 15 rebounds and five assists per game as senior. He committed to playing college basketball for Loyola Marymount over offers from UC Riverside, UC Irvine and Utah State.

College career
As a freshman at Loyola Marymount, Scott averaged 12.6 points and 7.3 rebounds per game. He set the program freshman record with 225 rebounds and was named to the West Coast Conference (WCC) All-Freshman Team. Scott averaged 7.9 points and 4.8 rebounds per game as a sophomore after missing his first six games with an illness. On December 4, 2019, he posted a junior season-high 31 points and 10 rebounds in a 76–64 victory over Colorado. In his next game, Scott recorded the first triple-double in program history, with 21 points, 13 rebounds and 13 assists in an 83–67 win over Grambling State. He averaged 15.5 points, 6.7 rebounds and 4.3 assists per game as a junior, earning Second Team All-WCC honors. On February 16, 2021, Scott scored a career-high 37 points and made the game-winning shot with 14 seconds left in a 76–73 victory over Santa Clara. He averaged 18 points, 8.2 rebounds and 3.6 assists per game as a senior, earning First Team All-WCC honors. Scott opted to return to Loyola Marymount for a fifth year. Scott was named to the Second Team All-WCC in 2022.

On March 4, 2022, Scott surpassed the 2,000 career point mark in his final game for LMU, a second round loss to BYU in the 2022 WCC tournament. He finished his career with 2,002 points, sixth in school history.

Career statistics

College

|-
| style="text-align:left;"| 2017–18
| style="text-align:left;"| Loyola Marymount
| 31 || 22 || 30.9 || .471 || .133 || .606 || 7.3 || 2.3 || .8 || .3 || 12.6
|-
| style="text-align:left;"| 2018–19
| style="text-align:left;"| Loyola Marymount
| 27 || 18 || 24.2 || .519 || .500 || .635 || 4.8 || 2.5 || .6 || .4 || 7.9
|-
| style="text-align:left;"| 2019–20
| style="text-align:left;"| Loyola Marymount
| 32 || 32 || 34.6 || .528 || .290 || .639 || 6.7 || 4.3 || 1.0 || .2 || 15.5
|-
| style="text-align:left;"| 2020–21
| style="text-align:left;"| Loyola Marymount
| 22 || 22 || 35.6 || .495 || .242 || .704 || 8.2 || 3.6 || .6 || .5 || 18.0
|-
| style="text-align:left;"| 2021–22
| style="text-align:left;"| Loyola Marymount
| 29 || 29 || 35.4 || .518 || .182 || .761 || 6.4 || 3.0 || .7 || .4 || 17.4
|- class="sortbottom"
| style="text-align:center;" colspan="2"| Career
| 141 || 123 || 32.1 || .506 || .237 || .672 || 6.6 || 3.1 || .8 || .3 || 14.2

SBL

|-
| style=“text-align:left;”| 2022-23
| style=“text-align:left;”| MBK Handlová
| 21 || 21 || 34.5 || .639 || .350 || .723 || 8.4 || 3.6 || 0.9 || 0.2 || 18.9

References

External links
Loyola Marymount Lions bio

1999 births
Living people
American men's basketball players
Basketball players from California
Chino Hills High School alumni
Loyola Marymount Lions men's basketball players
Shooting guards
Small forwards
Sportspeople from West Covina, California